François Henri René Allain-Targé (17 May  1832 – 16 July 1902) was a French politician of the French Third Republic. He served as Minister of finance under Léon Gambetta and Minister of the interior under Henri Brisson.

Early life and career 
Allain-Targé was born in Angers in an affluent family of magistrates. The son of a procureur général, he studied law in Poitiers and settled as a lawyer in his hometown in 1853. In 1857 he married Geneviève Villemain, a daughter of Abel-François Villemain, with whom he had two daughters. After holding the post of deputy-procureur from 1861 to 1864, he moved to Paris, where he became a contributor to newspapers opposed to Napoleon III. 

In 1868, he joined the editorial staff of the Republican newspaper L'Avenir national and, together with Léon Gambetta, Paul Challemel-Lacour, Eugène Spuller and others, founded the Revue politique, which was suppressed after a few months. In the 1869 French legislative election, he ran unsuccessfully in Maine-et-Loire against the outgoing deputy Charles Louvet.

Franco-Prussian War 

After the fall of the Second French Empire and Napoleon III in September 1870 in the midst of the Franco-Prussian War, Allain-Targé was appointed prefect of the department of Maine-et-Loire, then served as army commissioner and accompanied Gambetta to Bordeaux, when he left Paris and the seat of government  was transferred to that town, as prefect of Gironde. 

Like Gambetta, he was in favour of defending France to the utmost in the Franco-Prussian War and, when the election of a new National Assembly on 8 February 1871 turned out to be largely conservative, and having failed to gain a seat in 1871 French legislative election, he resigned. On 30 July 1871, he was elected as a radical member of the Municipal Council of Paris. With Gambetta he also founded the daily newspaper La République française in November 1871, for which he wrote until 1878.

Chamber of Deputies 
In the 1876 French legislative election, Allain-Targé was elected to the Chamber of Deputies, where, as a loyal supporter of Gambetta, he belonged to the Union républicaine faction and gained great influence as party leader, especially since President MacMahon's resignation in 1879. He was re-elected in 1877, 1881 and 1885. 

A staunch opponent of agreements with the private railway companies, he advocated a state takeover. Eventually he championed a solution that proposed the repurchase of small lines in difficulties, but the continuation of the big railway companies with increased state monitoring on all sectors of the railway system, including ticket prices, construction and exploitation. The amendment was passed in March 1877 in both Houses; and is considered to be the upshot to the Freycinet Plan.

When Gambetta took over the premiership on 14 November 1881, he put Allain-Targé in charge of the finance ministry. With Gambetta, Allain-Targé also resigned as early as 26 January 1882. In Henri Brisson's government, he served as Minister of the Interior from 6 April to 29 December 1885.

Retired and death
In the 1889 French legislative election in September/October, he no longer received a mandate as a deputy and, affected by the death of his wife in 1884 and his daughter (who had married Charles Ferry, the younger brother of Prime Minister Jules Ferry), in 1886, he decided to retire from politics. He died on 16 July 1902 at the age of 70 in the Chateau de Targé close to Parnay (Maine-et-Loire), where the family owned a castle.

References

Sources

1832 births
1902 deaths
Members of the 1st Chamber of Deputies of the French Third Republic
Members of the 2nd Chamber of Deputies of the French Third Republic
Members of the 3rd Chamber of Deputies of the French Third Republic
Members of the 4th Chamber of Deputies of the French Third Republic
French Ministers of Finance
French interior ministers